Philippines competed in the 2010 Asian Beach Games, held in Muscat, Oman from December 8 to December 16, 2010. The Philippine contingent went home without a medal during the second edition of the Asian Beach Games.

Nations at the 2010 Asian Beach Games
2010
Asian Beach Games